The State of Kerala consist of 14 districts, 27 
revenue divisions, and 78 taluks. Each revenue division is headed by a Revenue Divisional Officer and assisted by Senior Superintendent among others.

Kasaragod District
 Kasaragod RDO: Manjeshwaram (HQ: Uppala), Kasaragod
 Kanhangad RDO: Vellarikundu, Hosdurg (HQ: Kanhangad)

Kannur District
 Taliparamba RDO: Payyanur, Taliparamba, Kannur
 Thalassery RDO: Thalassery, Iritty

Wayanad District
 Mananthavady RDO: Mananthavady, Sulthan Bathery, Vythiri (HQ: Kalpetta)

Kozhikode District
 Vatakara RDO: Vatakara, Koyilandy
 Kozhikode RDO: Thamarassery, Kozhikode

Malappuram District
 Perinthalmanna RDO: Nilambur, Eranad (HQ: Manjeri), Perinthalmanna 
 Tirur RDO: Kondotty, Tirurangadi, Tirur, Ponnani

Palakkad District
 Ottappalam RDO: Pattambi, Ottappalam, Mannarkkad, Attappady (HQ: Agali)
 Palakkad RDO: Palakkad, Chittur, Alathur

Thrissur District
 Thrissur RDO: Thalapilly (HQ: Wadakkancheri), Kunnamkulam, Chavakkad, Thrissur 
 Irinjalakuda RDO: Kodungallur, Mukundapuram (HQ: Irinjalakuda), Chalakudy

Ernakulam District
 Ernakulam RDO: Kanayannur (HQ: Ernakulam), Kochi (HQ: Fort Kochi), North Paravur, Aluva
 Muvattupuzha RDO: Kothamangalam, Muvattupuzha, Kunnathunad(HQ: Perumbavoor)

Idukki District
 Devikulam RDO: Peermade, Udumbanchola (HQ: Nedumkandam), Devikulam
 Idukki RDO: Idukki (HQ: Painavu), Thodupuzha

Kottayam District
 Kottayam RDO: Changanasserry, Kottayam, Kanjirappally
 Palai RDO: Meenachil (HQ: Palai), Vaikom

Alappuzha District
 Chengannur RDO: Chengannur, Mavelikkara, Karthikappally (HQ: Haripad)
 Alappuzha RDO: Kuttanad (HQ: Mankombu), Ambalappuzha (HQ: Alappuzha), Cherthala

Pathanamthitta District
 Adoor RDO: Adoor, Konni, Kozhencherry (HQ: Pathanamthitta)
 Thiruvalla RDO: Ranni, Mallappally, Thiruvalla

Kollam District
 Kollam RDO: Kollam, Kunnathoor (HQ: Sasthamcotta), Karunagappally 
 Punalur RDO: Punalur, Pathanapuram, Kottarakkara

Thiruvananthapuram District
 Thiruvananthapuram RDO: Thiruvananthapuram, Chirayinkeezhu (HQ: Attingal), Varkala, Neyyattinkara
 Nedumangad RDO: Kattakkada, Nedumangadu

References

External links
 Revenue Department

Kerala geography-related lists